Madison Central High School (MCHS) is a suburban public high school located in Madison, Mississippi, United States. Madison Central is part of the Madison County School District. The principal is Sean Brewer.

The school colors are orange and blue and the school mascot is the jaguar. Madison Central is classified as a 6A public high school by the Mississippi High School Activities Association (MHSAA). In 2002, Madison Central was the first Mississippi visit of President George W. Bush.

History
Madison Central began classes in fall 1991, having been built at an estimated $9.7 million cost. The school absorbed students from Madison Ridgeland High School and East Flora High School.

Attendance boundary
In addition to Madison its attendance boundary includes Flora, and Kearney Park.

Academics
About a quarter of MCHS students take an Advanced Placement exam during their time at the school. The school's academic proficiency rates are above average for the state of Mississippi.

The Madison Central Academic Decathlon team claimed state championships every year from 2003 to 2019.

Athletics

Both the boys' and girls' soccer teams were nationally ranked by MaxPreps after their respective 2016 seasons.

Madison Central was one of 32 schools in the state and eight schools in District 6 to be reclassified from 5A to 6A by the MHSAA beginning in the 2009-10 school year. 
It is now a 6A school.

Performing arts

Madison Central has participated in the National Adjudicators Invitational, The Disney Honors, as well as performing in Carnegie Hall in New York City in April 2008.

MCHS has three competitive show choirs, the Varsity mixed-gender "Reveille”, the all-female "Renown", and the Junior Varsity mixed-gender “Radiance”.  The program also hosts an annual competition, the Deep South Classic.

Notable alumni
Ryan Bolden – professional baseball player
Shaq Buchanan (born 1997) - basketball player in the Israeli Basketball Premier League
Mike Espy Jr. (born 1982) – former professional football player
Stephen Gostkowski – professional football player
Parys Haralson – professional football player
Sarah Beth James – Miss Mississippi 2010
Chris Spencer – professional football player
Spencer Turnbull - professional baseball pitcher

References

 https://web.archive.org/web/20100101163447/http://www.usad.org/competition/winners.asp

External links
 Madison Central High School
 Madison County School District

1991 establishments in Mississippi
Educational institutions established in 1991
Public high schools in Mississippi
Schools in Madison County, Mississippi